The 4 Track Cassette is the second physical release by the band Rolo Tomassi. It was recorded at Ghost Town Studios in Leeds by Ross Halden at the end of June 2005. It was the band's first release through "Danger! Laser! Phaser! Razor!" and due to its limited availability it had sold out very soon after its release. In total there are 200 tapes and a variation of different styles of packaging.

Packaging styles:

 30 Black tapes in a draw-string cloth bag
 30 White tapes in a draw-string cloth bag
 70 Black tapes wrapped in blue paper with a button
 70 White tapes wrapped in blue paper with a button

Released on DLPR Records 22 July 2005

Track listing 

Also referred to as One Hundred and Seventy One

 "Codes Within Codes"
 "From Ambience To Ambulance"
 "Hiroshima 8.16am"
 "A Cosmic Accident"

Personnel 
Edward Dutton – drum kit
Joe Nicholson – electric guitar
Eva Spence – lead vocals
James Spence – synthesizers and co-lead vocals
Joseph Thorpe – electric bass guitar

References 

Rolo Tomassi albums
2005 EPs